Richard Dawson (born 6 July 1962) is an English former professional footballer who played as a defender in the Football League for York City and in non-League football for New Earswick, Scarborough, Frickley Athletic, Boston United, Goole Town, Chorley, Northwich Victoria and Harrogate Town.

He also briefly managed Bridlington Town and was player-manager for Mossley A.F.C. in 1994.

References

1962 births
Living people
Footballers from York
English footballers
Association football defenders
York City F.C. players
Scarborough F.C. players
Frickley Athletic F.C. players
Boston United F.C. players
Goole Town F.C. players
Chorley F.C. players
Northwich Victoria F.C. players
Harrogate Town A.F.C. players
Mossley A.F.C. players
English Football League players
National League (English football) players
Bridlington Town A.F.C. managers
Mossley A.F.C. managers
English football managers